Wild Wild Wet is a water theme park in Singapore. It is located at NTUC Downtown East in Pasir Ris, Singapore.

Overview
When the former Escape Theme Park ceased operation on 26 November 2011, the site was used to make way for a bigger Water Park and Costa Sands Resort. Wild Wild Wet was closed from 23 July till 1 November 2012 for renovations that includes new rides and attractions. Wild Wild Wet was expanded to 4 hectares from the original 2 hectares, approximately the size of five football fields which will double the original size and feature seven new rides and attractions which opened in late 2016. NTUC Club said admission fees are expected to go up slightly due to inflation and increasing operational costs. The new rides have since been opened up to the public.

See also
NTUC Downtown East
Escape Theme Park

References

External links
Official Website

Amusement parks in Singapore
2004 establishments in Singapore
Tourist attractions in Singapore
Water parks in Singapore
Pasir Ris